Karis is a town and former municipality in Finland. On January 1, 2009, it was consolidated with Ekenäs and Pohja to form the new municipality of Raseborg; .

It is located in the Finnish province of Southern Finland and is part of Uusimaa, one of the regions of Finland.

The municipality was bilingual, with a majority (59%) being Swedish language speakers and a minority (38%) being Finnish language speakers.

Karis railway station is on both the  line, connecting Helsinki Central railway station and Turku Central railway station; and on the Hanko–Hyvinkää railway where it is the junction station for branch line services to Hanko railway station. By driving along the national road 51 to Helsinki, the minimum distance is about 75 kilometers.

Stage magician Simo Aalto came from the town.

See also
Ingå
Junkarsborg
Virkkala

References

External links

Former municipalities of Finland
Populated places established in 1930
Populated places disestablished in 2009
2009 disestablishments in Finland
Raseborg